Prof. Edward Jones, CBE RIBA (Edward David Brynmor Jones) is an English architect, born in St Albans 20 October 1939. He is married to Canadian architect Margot Griffin.

Career
After schooling at Haileybury Jones trained at the Architectural Association where he met his future architectural partner Jeremy Dixon. They formed an informal practice in the mid sixties, which Peter Cook referred to as "The Grunt Group" to promote the modernist agenda.

He has been professor of architecture in Europe and North America including UCD Dublin, Royal College of Art, the Architectural Association, and Universities of Toronto, Princeton, Harvard, Cornell, Rice.

He was in private practice from 1973 to 1989 in London and in Toronto, Ontario, Canada. In 1989 he co-founded the architectural practice Jeremy Dixon. Edward Jones with Jeremy Dixon, called Dixon Jones since 2003. In 1973 the pair came to the attention of the national press when their "Great Pyramid" competition winning scheme for Northamptonshire County Hall was exhibited in London.

In 2000, The Observer listed two of his practice's London buildings in the Top 10 Buildings of the Year: the National Portrait Gallery and the Royal Opera House. From 2002 to 2010 he was honorary professor at University of Cardiff. In 2001 he received an Honorary Doctorate from University of Portsmouth, and an Honorary Fellowship from University of Cardiff, and in December 2010 he received a CBE for services to architecture.

National Life Stories conducted an oral history interview (C467/98) with Edward Jones in 2011 for its Architects Lives' collection held by the British Library.

Major projects
Mississauga Civic Centre, Canada (1987)
Darwin College Study Centre, Cambridge University (1993)
National Portrait Gallery, London (2000)
Royal Opera House, London (1999)
Somerset House Masterplan, London (2001)
Saïd Business School, Oxford (2001)
Villa Jones, France (2005)
Kings Place, London (2008)
Exhibition Road Masterplan (2011)
Quadrant 3 for The Crown Estate – London 2006 – 2011
Masterplan for Chelsea Barracks – London 2010 - 2012
Olympic Way Steps, Wembley Park, London 2016 - 2021

Publications
 Edward Jones and Christopher Woodward, A Guide to the Architecture of London (Weidenfeld and Nicolson) 1983, 4th edition 2009 
 DIXON JONES, Right Angle Publishing Ltd, 2002.

References

20th-century English architects
Living people
1939 births
People educated at Haileybury and Imperial Service College
People from St Albans
Architects from Hertfordshire
Commanders of the Order of the British Empire